Lipovu is a commune in Dolj County, Oltenia, Romania with a population of 3,189 people. It is composed of two villages, Lipovu and Lipovu de Sus.

References

Communes in Dolj County
Localities in Oltenia